Saraye Ameriha is a historic house in Kashan, Iran, originally built as a family residence during Zand dynasty for Agha Āmeri, the governor of Kashan, and has now been restored and transformed into a traditional-style museum and hotel. Being the largest traditional house in Kashan, it has several interior and exterior yards, each consisting of pools and many rooms. It also has the highest wind catcher in Kashan.

History 
Ameri House was built 200 years ago. The building had fallen into ruin for several years but is now a museum and boutique hotel.
The Saraye Ameriha house is a large historic house in Kashan, Iran. It was originally built as a family residence during Zand dynasty for Agha Āmeri, the governor of Kashan, and has since been restored and transformed into a traditional-style hotel.

The first attempt to restore a part of Kashan’s local culture began in 1999, and Ameriha House was entrusted to an experienced team for restoration, since it was ruined after earthquakes and lack of attention. The house was restored based on its original blueprints and the first phase of the restoration project finally ended in 2014. Phase two ended in 2017 and phase three is still going on, as new yards and areas are restored and made open for public visits. The house’s inauguration ceremony was held in 2014 and Masoud Soltanifar, Vice President of Iran and head of Cultural Heritage, Handcrafts and Tourism Organization, professor Samii and other statesmen were in attendance for inaugurating ceremony.

Structure
It contains dozens of rooms, two bathhouses, and seven courtyards with gardens and fountains. The main structure is made of brick. Mud and straw are used in the insulation. The inner spaces are decorated with gypsum and mirror works.
It has the highest wind catcher (Badgir) amongst houses in Kashan, and like other traditional Iranian houses, it consists of interior and exterior sections, porches, pools, yards, crew yards, stables covered with ornamentations such as stucco, Mogharnas, paintings on plaster, woodwork, woodcarving and some other ornamentation arts. It is close to some monuments of Kashan like Tabatabai House and Borojerdi House.

Amenities 
Saraye Ameriha has several main yards, each with a large or small pool, surrounded by guest rooms and suites. Currently, it has 27 rooms, including presidentials and royals. Other facilities include a carpet weaving house, conference room for national and international cultural programmes and seminars, Sohrab Sepehri Gallery of art, souvenir shop, coffee house, restaurant and other saloons and halls. The main structure is made of brick. Mud and straw are used in the insulation. The inner spaces are decorated with gypsum and mirror works.

Gallery

References

External links 
 Official Website

Hotels in Iran
Heritage hotels
Zand dynasty
Buildings and structures in Kashan